Pronoia describes a state of mind that is the opposite of paranoia.  Whereas a person suffering from paranoia feels that persons or entities are conspiring against them, a person experiencing pronoia believes that the world around them conspires to do them good. The belief can be an irrational belief subject to medical diagnosis, or an enthusiastic, spiritual belief. The word entered the scientific literature in 1982 and was popularized by the Zippy movement in the 1990s.

In psychology 

The word appeared in the psychological literature in 1982, when the academic journal Social Problems published an article entitled "Pronoia" by Dr. Fred H. Goldner of Queens College in New York City, in which Goldner described a phenomenon opposite to paranoia and provided numerous examples of specific persons who displayed such characteristics.

Pronoia is the positive counterpart of paranoia. It is the delusion that others think well of one. Actions and the products of one's efforts are thought to be well received and praised by others. Mere acquaintances are thought to be close friends; politeness and the exchange of pleasantries are taken as expressions of deep attachment and the promise of future support. Pronoia appears rooted in the social complexity and cultural ambiguity of our lives: we have become increasingly dependent on the opinions of others based on uncertain criteria.

Goldner's paper received a good deal of publicity at the time, including references in Psychology Today, the New York Daily News, The Wall Street Journal, and other publications.

Antecedents 

In early Christian works, the Greek word "pronoia" refers to Divine Providence, a continuing benevolent force that keeps the world in order. There is a considerable body of work on this usage.

The author J.D. Salinger foreshadowed the concept later called pronoia in his 1955 novella, Raise High the Roof Beam, Carpenters. In it, the character Seymour Glass writes in his diary, "Oh, God, if I'm anything by a clinical name, I'm a kind of paranoiac in reverse. I suspect people of plotting to make me happy."

In popular culture 

In 1993 the writer and Electronic Frontier Foundation co-founder John Perry Barlow characterized pronoia as "the suspicion the Universe is a conspiracy on your behalf".

In May 1994, Wired magazine published an article titled "Zippie!"

The cover of the magazine featured a psychedelic image of a smiling young man with wild hair, a funny hat, and crazy eyeglasses. Written by Jules Marshall, the article announced an organized cultural response to Thatcherism in the United Kingdom. The opening paragraphs describe "a new and contagious cultural virus" and refer to "pronoia" as "the sneaking feeling one has that others are conspiring behind your back to help you".
The article announces a cultural and musical invasion of the United States to rival the British Invasion of 1964–1966, culminating with a "Woodstock Revival" to be staged at the Grand Canyon in August 1994. The spokesperson for the Zippies, Fraser Clark, dubs this movement the "Zippy Pronoia Tour". An article in The New York Times published in August 1994 also described the Zippies and their efforts. It contained two references to pronoia.

In the 1997 film Fierce Creatures, Jamie Lee Curtis's character describes Kevin Kline's character as excessively "pronoid": "It means that despite all the available evidence, you actually think that people like you.  Your perception of life is that it is one long benefit dinner in your honor, with everyone cheering you on and wanting you to win everything. You think you're the prince, Vince."

The horoscope columnist Rob Brezsny proposed a philosophy based on pronoia in his 2005 book Pronoia Is the Antidote for Paranoia: How the Whole World Is Conspiring to Shower You with Blessings.

Actress Susan Sarandon, describing her experience in working on the 2012 film Cloud Atlas, described "pronoia" as the opposite of the noted line from Joseph Heller's Catch-22: "Just because you're paranoid doesn't mean they aren't after you";  Sarandon said "You just assume that the universe is conspiring for you, not against you. ... I think that the more you expect that, the more it actually works out."

On July 13, 2018, in response to Donald Trump's claim that the British "love him", actor John Cleese explained in a series of tweets:
My American friends are asking me about President Trump's observation that the British 'like him'. I regret this is quite unfounded. The explanation for this canard is that Trump is pronoid. Pronoid is the opposite of paranoid. A paranoid person thinks, without any basis in reality, that everybody is out to get them. A pronoid person is someone who thinks, without any basis in reality, that everybody likes them.

See also 
Grandiose delusions
Paranoia
Psychology

References

1982 introductions
Mental states